Janusz Wolański (born 13 July 1979 in Pilzno) is a Polish midfielder who most recently played for Wisłok Wiśniowa.

External links

External links 
 

1979 births
Living people
People from Dębica County
Polish footballers
Wisłoka Dębica players
Ceramika Opoczno players
Szczakowianka Jaworzno players
Górnik Łęczna players
Zagłębie Sosnowiec players
Jagiellonia Białystok players
Polonia Bytom players
ŁKS Łódź players
KSZO Ostrowiec Świętokrzyski players
Kolejarz Stróże players
Karpaty Krosno players
Association football midfielders
Sportspeople from Podkarpackie Voivodeship